The Raak Plain Boinka is a wilderness area in the state of Victoria, Australia. The boinka groundwater discharge complex is a shallow depression within a region of Mallee dune fields, and contains gypsum flats and salinas, pools of salty water that are mainly fed by groundwater. The distinctive flora of the boinka is largely intact and includes several threatened species.

Location

The boinka complex lies to the east of the Sunset Strip, a NE-SW trending elevated block on the west of the Danyo Fault.
The boinka is north of Mount Cowra and Wymlet.
The Calder Highway running from north to south through Nowingi defines the eastern boundary.
The Hattah-Kulkyne National Park lies to the east of the highway.
The boinka lies within part of the Murray Mallee plain.
There is a fringe of Lowan Mallee along its south edge.

Terrain

Raak Plains and Pink Lakes, further west in Murray-Sunset National Park, are outstanding examples of the boinka landform complex of sandplains, gypsum flats, gypsite hills, salinas and source-bordering dunes.
The country is extremely rugged, and contains a system of saline blue lakes formed by water that discharges from below ground.
The discharge complex, which Phillip Macumber calls the "Raak boinka", is a broad depression with a distinctive outer boundary and markedly different appearance from the aeolian Mallee landscapes that surround it.
It includes dunes and islands of sand and gypsum clay, plains of sand, clay and limestone, gypsum flats and halite salinas in the lowest parts.

The depression is bounded by the  contour.
In the west there is a sharply defined boundary between the gypsum flats and salinas of the boinka and the dune fields.
To the east the boundary is less distinct as aeolian sands from within the boinka merge into the linear dunefields.
The plain includes a number of islands that rise above the flats, and are parts of the linear dunefield that were cut off from the Mallee as the discharge zone expanded.
There are small salinas to the west of the plain, near the rim of the basin.

The Raak Plain holds the largest groundwater discharge in the state.
There are more than 50 naturally "playas", or saline lakes, and gypseous saltmarsh plains.
Probably most of the reflux brine was collected when the climate was wetter than it is today, and most recharge now comes from the main Raak salina when it is filled with rainwater.
MacArthur's Lake is an example of a small salina in the southeast of the Raak boinka.
It is covered with a shallow sheet of water in the winter, but dries out in warmer weather.
Salinity in the lake rises from 149,000 mg/L in July to 206,000 mg/L in September due to evaporative concentration.
The salinity of the lake water is about 3.5 times that of the groundwater.

The Raak boinka is underlain by Blanchetown Clay.
Soils are mostly loose red-brown sands that form dunes in the central part of the plain.
Seasonally saturated saline soils predominate in a large part of the west of the plain.
The ages of source bordering gypsum dunes in the Raak boinka have been determined using Optically stimulated luminescence (OSL).
They were formed between 20,000 and 35,000 years ago, and between 70,000 and 85,000 years ago.
One of the dunes was dated to around 127,000 years ago.

Human presence

There are a number of Aboriginal cultural heritage sites in the boinka, including large sites with artifacts, ovens and middens.
Velesunio shells dated to around 7,650 years ago have been found at an aboriginal campsite near the west of the Raak boinka, along with many artifacts and hearths.
The shells indicate the presence of fresh water nearby.
However, even though the Mallee was wetter at the time, it is underlaid by groundwater brines, so pools would have been salty.
Possibly the freshwater was found in dune soaks, where rainwater filtering through the dune is trapped by a clay layer at its base.
Another explanation could be that the shells were brought from a larger Hattah Lake system immediately to the east of the Raak boinka.

Some of the land is freehold, and some is State Forest used for grazing and salt mining under lease.
About 18% of the boinka is used for grazing, mostly around Nowingi in the northeast.
Gypsum is mined in Victoria for use as soil conditioner and for plaster and plasterboard in the construction industry.
Brunswick Plaster Mills used to operate a railway to transport gypsum from the Raak Plain to the Victorian Railways interchange siding at Nowingi.
The rusty remains of a fuel tanker truck that blew up when transporting diesel to the Brunswick Plaster Mills gypsum mine can still be seen on the northern edge of the Raak Plain.

Environment

The west of the boinka is contained within the east of the Murray-Sunset National Park.
The Raak Plain Reference Area, covering  of the plain, has been designated IUCN category Ia (Strict Nature Reserve) as of 1996.
It is managed by the Department of Environment, Land, Water and Planning of the State of Victoria.
The Raak Plain Reference Area is within the Murray-Sunset National Park.

Since the natural salinity of the region makes in unsuitable for agriculture, about 82% of the original habitat remains.
The natural vegetation is diverse and includes Samphire (Tecticornia) and Low Chenopod Shrubland.
Threatened birds include Regent parrot (Polytelis anthopeplus monarchoides) and Malleefowl (Leipoa ocellata).
Threatened plants include Bead Glasswort (Tecticornia flabelliformis), Purple Swainson-pea (Swainsona purpurea), Mallee Hemichroa (Hemichroa diandra) and Spiked Pigweed (Dysphania simulans).

The Raak Plain is threatened by rabbits, which selectively graze saplings of the buloke woodland communities and thus prevent regeneration.
The ground-dwelling threatened Mallee birds are the target of predation by foxes.
In 2004 there was controversy over a proposal for an industrial waste storage site near Mildura on the edge of the plain, which could contaminate the groundwater.

Notes

Citations

Sources

 

Wetlands of Victoria (Australia)
Plains of Australia